Mónica González may refer to:

 Mónica González (journalist) (1949), Chilean journalist
 Mónica González (dancer), Argentine theater dancer and vedette active in 2000s
 Monica Gonzalez (soccer) (1978), Mexican-American footballer
 Monica Gonzalez (boxer) (1988), Puerto Rican boxer
 Monika Gonzalez, Italian opera singer